Baltimore, Maryland is home to numerous universities and colleges both public and private. The following includes a list of the educational institutions throughout Baltimore City and Baltimore County.

Public four-year colleges and universities

Private, non-profit colleges and universities

References

External links

U.S. Department of Education listing of accredited institutions in Maryland

 
Baltimore
Universities and colleges
Universities